Gravel Run is a  long 2nd order tributary to French Creek in Crawford County, Pennsylvania.

Variant names
According to the Geographic Names Information System, it has also been known historically as:
Gravel Creek

Course
Gravel Run rises about 1.5 miles west of Pinney Corners, Pennsylvania, and then flows generally west-northwest to join French Creek about 1.5 miles west of Woodcock, Pennsylvania.

Watershed
Gravel Run drains  of area, receives about 44.9 in/year of precipitation, has a wetness index of 436.22, and is about 53% forested.

See also
 List of rivers of Pennsylvania

References

Rivers of Pennsylvania
Rivers of Crawford County, Pennsylvania